Voting rights of United States citizens who live in Puerto Rico, like the voting rights of residents of other United States territories, differ from those of United States citizens in each of the fifty states and the District of Columbia.  Residents of Puerto Rico and other U.S. territories do not have voting representation in the United States Congress, and are not entitled to electoral votes for president. The United States Constitution grants congressional voting representation to U.S. states, which Puerto Rico and other U.S. territories are not, specifying that members of Congress shall be elected by direct popular vote and that the president and the vice president shall be elected by electors chosen by the states.

Puerto Rico is a territory under the sovereignty of the federal government, but is not part of any state nor is it a state itself. It has been organized (given a measure of self-rule by the Congress) subject to the Congress' plenary powers under the territorial clause of Article IV, sec. 3, of the U.S. Constitution. In the U.S. House of Representatives, Puerto Rico is entitled to a resident commissioner, a delegate who is not allowed to vote on the floor of the House but can vote on procedural matters and in House committees. In most other U.S. overseas (and historically pre-state) territories, as well as the District of Columbia, a similar representative position is styled Delegate.

The lack of direct voting representation in Congress for residents of the territory has been an issue since the U.S. Congress granted U.S. citizenship to Puerto Rico citizens in 1917.  All judicial claims have been met with political or constitutional challenges; therefore, there has been no change in Puerto Rico's representation in the Congress or representation on the electoral college for the U.S. citizens residing in Puerto Rico.

Like other territories, Puerto Rico holds presidential primary elections in the spring of each presidential election year in which the parties choose delegates to the Republican and Democratic national conventions. While these delegates do vote for their pledged candidate at their respective convention, this marks the end of the territory's participation in the presidential election.

Background
Puerto Rico is  an insular area—a United States territory that is neither a part of one of the fifty states nor a part of the District of Columbia, the nation's federal district. Insular areas, including Puerto Rico, the U.S. Virgin Islands and Guam, are not allowed to choose electors in U.S. presidential elections or elect voting members of the U.S. Congress.  This grows out of Articles One and Two of the United States Constitution, which state that electors are to be chosen by "the People of the several States."  In 1961, the 23rd amendment extended the right to choose electors to the District of Columbia; the insular areas, however, were not addressed in that Amendment.

Inter-American Commission on Human Rights claim
On December 29, 2003, The Inter-American Commission on Human Rights of the Organization of American States concluded that the United States is responsible for violations of the District of Columbia's rights under Articles II and XX of the American Declaration of the Rights and Duties of Man by denying District of Columbia citizens an effective opportunity to participate in their federal legislature. On October 17, 2006, Pedro Rosselló, a former governor of Puerto Rico, and the Unfinished Business of American Democracy Committee on behalf of the approximately four million U.S. citizens residing in the Commonwealth of Puerto Rico, presented a petition to the Inter-American Commission on Human Rights of the Organization of American States seeking the Commission's aid in obtaining enfranchisement.

Disenfranchisement in Puerto Rico

Any U.S. citizen who resides in Puerto Rico is effectively disenfranchised at the national level, as are all U.S. citizen residents of U.S. unincorporated territories. Although the Republican Party and Democratic Party chapters in Puerto Rico have selected voting delegates to the national nominating conventions participating in U.S. presidential primaries or caucuses, U.S. citizens without a voting residence in one of the 50 states or in the District of Columbia may not vote in federal elections.

Both the Puerto Rican Independence Party and the New Progressive Party reject the status quo that permits disenfranchisement (from their distinct respective positions on the ideal enfranchised status for the island-nation of Puerto Rico). The remaining political organization, the Popular Democratic Party, has officially stated that it favors fixing the remaining "deficits of democracy" that the Bill Clinton and George W. Bush administrations have publicly recognized in writing through reports of the President's Task Force on Puerto Rico's Status.

In 2003, attorney Gregorio Igartúa and others in a third round of litigation (Igartúa III) filed suit seeking to enfranchise U.S. citizens residents of Puerto Rico with the right to vote for the U.S. President and Vice President.

The U.S. Court of Appeals decision in 2005, on appeal of the decision in Igartúa III, Igartua-de la Rosa v. United States, 417 F.3d 145 (1st Cir. P.R. 2005), reads in part:

Judges Campbell and Lipez concurred in the decision. Judge Torruella dissented, opening his dissent as follows:

Igartúa v. United States
In 2008, attorney Gregorio Igartúa and others in a fourth round of litigation (Igartúa IV) attempted to bring a class action suit claiming they and other U.S. citizen-residents of Puerto Rico have a right to vote for a Representative to the U.S. House of Representatives from Puerto Rico and a right to have Representatives from Puerto Rico in that body.

The 2010 United States Court of Appeals for the First Circuit decision read in part:

Lipez opened his concurrence opinion as follows:

Torruella opened his Opinion Concurring in Part and Dissenting in Part, as follows:

In 1961, just a few years after the United Nations first ratified the ICCPR, the Twenty-third Amendment to the United States Constitution was passed, allowing United States citizens residing in the District of Columbia to vote for the executive offices.  a bill was pending in Congress that would treat the District of Columbia as "a congressional district for purposes of representation in the House of Representatives", and permit United States citizens residing in the capital to vote for members of the House of Representatives. However, the United States has not taken similar steps with regard to the four million United States citizens and nationals who reside in the U.S. territories, of which close to three million are residents of Puerto Rico. In an opinion concurring in part and dissenting in part in a judicial decision, Circuit Judge Juan R. Torruella, who is Puerto Rican, wrote that this inaction is in clear violation of the United States' obligations under the ICCPR.

In August 2017, the en banc First Circuit rejected another lawsuit by Igartúa challenging Puerto Rico's exclusion from United States congressional apportionment, over the dissents of Judges Torruella, Kermit Lipez, and Ojetta Rogeriee Thompson.

See also

 Elections in Puerto Rico
 Voting rights in the United States
 Uniformed and Overseas Citizens Absentee Voting Act
 District of Columbia voting rights
 Twenty-third Amendment to the United States Constitution
 Implications of Puerto Rico's current political status

Notes

References

Voting
Puerto Rico